This article features a listing of all professional sports teams based in the United States and Canada, in addition to teams from other countries that compete in professional leagues based in the two countries.

Baseball

Major League Baseball

International League

Pacific Coast League

Eastern League

Southern League

Texas League

Midwest League

Northwest League

South Atlantic League

California League

Carolina League

Florida State League

American Association of Professional Baseball

Atlantic League of Professional Baseball 

Future team

Frontier League

Pioneer League

Empire Professional Baseball League

Pacific Association of Professional Baseball Clubs

Pecos League

United Shore Professional Baseball League 
This league has played all of its games at Jimmy John's Field in Utica, Michigan since its establishment in 2016.

Basketball

National Basketball Association

Canadian Elite Basketball League

National Basketball League of Canada

NBA G League

Women's National Basketball Association

Football

National Football League

Canadian Football League

United States Football League

XFL

Indoor Football League

Champions Indoor Football

National Arena League

X League

Ice hockey

National Hockey League

American Hockey League

ECHL

Southern Professional Hockey League

Federal Prospects Hockey League

Ligue Nord-Américaine de Hockey

Premier Hockey Federation

Lacrosse

National Lacrosse League

Premier Lacrosse League

Rodeo

Professional Bull Riders Team Series

Rugby league

USA Rugby League

Rugby union

Major League Rugby

Soccer

Major League Soccer

Canadian Premier League

USL Championship

MLS Next Pro 

Future teams

USL League One

National Women's Soccer League 

Future teams

Major Arena Soccer League

Cricket

Softball

Women's Professional Fastpitch

Tennis

World TeamTennis

Ultimate

American Ultimate Disc League

Premier Ultimate League

NASCAR

NASCAR Cup Series

See also
 Professional sports leagues in the United States
 Major professional sports leagues in the United States and Canada
 Major professional sports teams of the United States and Canada
 Prominent women's sports leagues in the United States and Canada
 List of American and Canadian cities by number of major professional sports franchises
 List of top level minor league sports teams in the United States by city
 List of soccer clubs in the United States by city

References

External links
North American Pro Sports Teams – Lists every league that has operated in Canada and / or the United States. Grouped by city.

Professional sports teams in the United States and Canada
Professional sports teams in the United States and Canada